The 2004 Peace and Friendship Cup was a two-day preseason men's football friendly tournament hosted by Persian Gulf Pro League clubs Foolad Khuzestan B and Esteghlal Ahvaz U20. The tournament was played between clubs from the cities of Ahvaz, Iran, and Basra, Iraq; both cities are located on the Shatt al-Arab.

The lone edition of the tournament took place on 16 and 18 February 2004 and featured Foolad Khuzestan B, Esteghlal Ahvaz U20, Al-Mina'a, and Naft Al-Junoob.

The winners of the tournament were Al-Mina'a, who defeated Foolad Khuzestan B in the final.

Competition format
The competition has the format of a regular knock-out competition. The winners of each of the two matches on the first day compete against each other for the tournament title, while the two losing sides play in a third-place match. The trophy is contested over two days, with two matches being played on each day.

Matches
 Semi-finals

 Third place match

 Final

References

International club association football competitions hosted by Iran
Sport in Ahvaz
Sport in Basra
2004–05 in Iranian football
Mahshahr County
Sport in Khuzestan Province
Sports competitions in Iran